Perth South was a federal electoral district represented in the House of Commons of Canada from 1867 to 1935. It was located in the province of Ontario. It was created by the British North America Act of 1867, which divided the County of Perth into two ridings. The South Riding of the County of Perth initially consisted of the Townships of Blanchard, Downie, South Easthope, Fullarton, Hibbert, and the Villages of Mitchell and St. Marys.

In 1882, the townships of Usborne were added to the riding, and that of South Easthope was excluded. In 1903, Usborne was removed from the riding, and Easthope South and Logan townships were added. In 1914, the part of the village of Tavistock situated in the township of Easthope South was added.

In 1924, Perth South was defined to consist of the part of the county of Perth lying south of and including the townships of Logan, Fullerton and Downie, south of but excluding the city of Stratford, south of but including the township of Easthope South to the east boundary of the said county. That part of Tavistock lying in the township of Easthope South was also included.

The electoral district was abolished in 1933 when it was redistributed between Huron—Perth and Perth ridings.

Members of Parliament

* denotes byelection

Electoral history

|- 
  
|Liberal
|Robert MacFarlane
|align="right"|1,490   
 
|Unknown
|T. B. Guest
|align="right"|1,393    

|- 
  
|Liberal
|TROW, James
|align="right"|1,683   
 
|Unknown
|KIDD, J.
|align="right"| 1,256   
|}

|- 
  
|Liberal
|TROW, James 
|align="right"| acclaimed   
|}

|- 
  
|Liberal
|TROW, James 
|align="right"| 1,796   
 
|Unknown
|HORNIBROOK, E.
|align="right"|1,719  
|}

|- 
  
|Liberal
|TROW, James 
|align="right"| 1,896   
 
|Unknown
|GUEST, Thos. B. 
|align="right"| 1,717    
|}

|- 
  
|Liberal
|TROW, James
|align="right"| 2,224   
  
|Conservative
|SHARP, H.F.
|align="right"|2,131    
|}

|- 
  
|Liberal
|TROW, James
|align="right"| 2,363   
  
|Conservative
|SHARP, H.F.
|align="right"| 2,186    
|}

|- 
  
|Conservative
|PRIDHAM, William
|align="right"|acclaimed    
|}

|- 
  
|Liberal
|ERB, D.K.
|align="right"| 2,069   
  
|Conservative
|PRIDHAM, Wm. 
|align="right"| 1,851    
 
|Protestant Protective
|DONALD, J.A. 
|align="right"|551    
|}

|- 
  
|Liberal
|ERB, Dilman Kinsey 
|align="right"| 2,169   
  
|Conservative
|PRIDHAM, William 
|align="right"| 2,160    
|}

|- 
  
|Liberal
|MCINTYRE, Gilbert H. 
|align="right"|2,454   
  
|Conservative
|STEELE, Michael 
|align="right"|2,310    
|}

|- 
  
|Liberal
|MCINTYRE, Gilbert Howard 
|align="right"|2,412   
  
|Conservative
|STEELE, Michael
|align="right"| 2,383    
|}

|- 
  
|Conservative
|STEELE, Michael 
|align="right"|  2,303    
  
|Liberal
|MCINTYRE, Gilbert Howard 
|align="right"| 2,221   
|}

|- 
  
|Government
|STEELE, Michael
|align="right"| 2,770   
  
|Opposition
|FORRESTER, William 
|align="right"| 2,713   
|}

|- 
  
|Liberal
|FORRESTER, William 
|align="right"| 3,209   
  
|Conservative
|STEELE, Michael 
|align="right"| 2,948    

|}

|- 
  
|Liberal
|SANDERSON, Frederick George  
|align="right"| 4,455   
  
|Conservative
|GRAHAM, Robert S. 
|align="right"| 4,041    
|}

|- 
  
|Liberal
|SANDERSON, Fred George 
|align="right"| 4,966   
  
|Conservative
|GRAHAM, Robert S. 
|align="right"|4,451    
|}

|- 
  
|Liberal
|SANDERSON, Frederick George
|align="right"|  5,063   
  
|Conservative
|MONTEITH, Samuel James
|align="right"|  4,346    
|}

See also 

 List of Canadian federal electoral districts
 Past Canadian electoral districts

References

External links 

 Website of the Parliament of Canada

Former federal electoral districts of Ontario